Nicolas Fizes (27 October 1648 in Frontignan – 1718) was a French professor of mathematics and hydrography, who lived under the reign of Louis XIV. He is especially known as the librettist who wrote L'Opéra de Frontignan (1670), a play in Occitan, dealing with a slight love intrigue, and an idyllic poem on the fountain of Frontignan.

Career 
Nicolas Fizes's parents were carpenters in the French Navy. He studied with the Jesuits, and became engineer to armies and a doctor of law. In 1682 he held the first professorship of mathematics and hydrography in Montpellier.

From 1689, he headed a school of hydrography in Frontignan. In the hall of the Town Hall, he taught a few young sailors the concepts of mathematics and astrology. But this school was previously free, and Fizes asked for a salary of 150 pounds a year, which led to a conflict with the consuls of Frontignan. The school only survived 7 years, and closed its doors in 1696.

Bibliography 
  Lucien Albagnac, Contribution à l'Histoire de Frontignan (no ISBN)
 André Cablat, René Michel, Maurice Nougaret, Jean Valette, La Petite Encyclopédie de Frontignan la Peyrade (no ISBN)

See also
 Occitan literature

1648 births
People from Hérault
1718 deaths
French mathematicians
Mathematics educators
French hydrographers
French opera librettists